Codename: ICEMAN (pronounced as "Iceman") is a graphical adventure game made with the SCI engine and published by the American computer game company Sierra On-Line in 1989. The lead designer was Jim Walls, who also created several Police Quest games. Mention of a "Codename: PHOENIX" in Sierra promotional material suggests that ICEMAN was meant to be the first part of a Codename series, but disappointing sales ended the would-be franchise after one game.

One of ICEMAN'''s most notable features is that a large portion of it takes place in a submarine; a portion of the game also requires the player to navigate the sub using an extremely scaled-down model.

Plot
The story takes place during a future global oil shortage, when Tunisia is suddenly discovered to possess a surplus of high-grade oil. While the Soviet and U.S. governments try to acquire as much of the oil as they can, Soviet-backed terrorists kidnap a U.S. ambassador in hopes of provoking an international incident.

Naval officer Johnny Westland is informed about the situation during his leave in Tahiti and is called back for the rescue mission. The night before returning to duty, he has a one-night stand with Stacy, a mysterious beautiful woman.

In the Pentagon, Westland is briefed and learns that Stacy is also an agent whom he must meet as soon as he reaches his goal. To reach his target, Westland travels in a nuclear-powered submarine, the USS Blackhawk. After fighting with Soviet vessels, navigating his way through an iceberg field and repairing some malfunctioning devices, he must penetrate the electronic harbor surveillance of Tunisia. A diving vehicle must be maneuvered through sensitive magnetic fields without being detected.

Finally, Westland meets Stacy on the shores of Tunisia. Working together, the agents free the ambassador; Westland is promoted and proposes to Stacy.

Gameplay and technical features

Technologically, ICEMAN is more advanced than Sierra's earlier games. Westland's movement is animated in 8 directions instead of 4, the character's sprite goes through several changes of appearance depending on his clothing, and character animations are generally smooth (e.g. the movements while playing dice.)

Another innovation allows the player to optionally just stand in front of an object and type , instead of trying several nouns to match the object. Also, typing  causes Westland to turn towards the object in question.

On the other hand, the text parser understands only certain syntaxes. The feature of examining items with the right mouse button is implemented only for limited items on the screen. For the rest, the player must type .

Most puzzles in the game revolve around procedures, be they first aid, military or bureaucratic, that are usually outlined in the manual. Generally, if the player fails to follow a strict procedure (for instance, checking if a guard returned the player's ID card, rather than someone else's), the consequences will not surface until much later in the game. At some points, the game is unwinnable and the player must restore to a previously saved position.

Additionally, some portions of the game depend heavily on random factors, such as the effectiveness of torpedoes in submarine battles. At one point, the player must obtain a bottle from a crewman on the sub, but only if the player can beat him at a dice game. The crewman 'accuses' the player of cheating if the player repeatedly saves and restores in an effort to win at dice (he is allowed to do so only twice).

ReceptionComputer Gaming World in 1990 liked the simulation sequences, improved parser, art, difficult puzzles, and sound card support, but said that the iceberg sequence became boring. It concluded that fans of Sierra adventures or James Bond would enjoy the game. In a 2007 review, Dante Kleinberg of Adventure Gamers gave ICEMAN 1.5 stars out of 5, citing dead end situations and frustrating simulator sequences. Kleinberg however praised the game's "classic Sierra look and feel."

Theo Clarke reviewed Codename: ICEMAN for Games International'' magazine, and gave it a rating of 10 out of 10, and stated that "It is the most sophisticated adventure game that I have ever played. Sierra have exceeded even their own remarkable standards."

References

External links

1989 video games
Adventure games
Amiga games
Atari ST games
Classic Mac OS games
DOS games
ScummVM-supported games
Sierra Entertainment games
Spy video games
Video games set in French Polynesia
Video games set in Gibraltar
Video games set in Hawaii
Video games set in Tunisia
Video games set in Virginia
Video games scored by Mark Seibert
Single-player video games
Video games developed in the United States